The United Nations High-level Political Forum on Sustainable Development (HLPF) is a subsidiary body of both the United Nations General Assembly and the United Nations Economic and Social Council responsible for the entire organization's policy on sustainable development. It adopts negotiated declarations, reviews commitment and the progress of the 2030 Agenda for Sustainable Development (the 17 Sustainable Development Goals, SDGs or Global Goals). The Forum replaced the Commission on Sustainable Development on the 24 September 2013  Meetings of the Forum are open to all Member States of the United Nations.

Mandate and tasks 

As the Forum is held under the authority of both the Economic and Social Council and the General Assembly, the body hosts two different types of meetings:
 While under the auspices of the General Assembly: Once every four years at the level of Heads of State and Government for a period of two days.
 While under the auspices of the Economic and Social Council: Yearly, for a period of eight days, including a three-day ministerial segment.
The HLPF was created with the aim to strengthen sustainable development governance at the United Nations. It works to achieve this through its mandate, which states the following in respect to sustainable development:

Resolution A/RES/66/288:Resolution A/RES/67/290:

Sustainable Development Commitments Review 
The Forum is responsible for the follow up and the review of progress of implementation of the following sustainable development commitments:
Agenda 21
 Johannesburg Plan of Implementation
Barbados Programme of Action
 Mauritius Strategy
Rio+20
 LDC-IV
As well as the relevant outcomes of other United Nations summits and conferences.

Meeting themes 
Every year since 2013, the HLPF has held a session. The meetings are held in July. Due to the COVID-19 pandemic, the forum took place virtually in 2020 for the first time.

History 
The HLPF has its origin in the Commission on Sustainable Development (CSD), which was created in 1992 to ensure follow-up of the Conference on Environment and Development (UNCED). This Commission met a total of 20 times, with its last session on 20 September 2013.

At the 2012 Conference on Sustainable Development, or Rio+20, it was decided that the Commission would be replaced by the High-Level Political Forum on Sustainable Development. This new Forum would meet under the auspices of both the Economic and Social Council, as well as the General Assembly. The Forum was formally created by Resolution 67/290 on 9 July 2013.

See also
 Earth Summit
Rio Declaration on Environment and Development
 Durban III The conference opened on 22 September 2011
 Planetary boundaries

References

External links
 Official website of HLPF
 UN DESA - Division for Sustainable Development

United Nations Economic and Social Council
International sustainability organizations
Environmental conferences
Sustainable development
Sustainable Development Goals